Terno (English: "[the] Young"), is a Polish Romani music collective founded in 1953. Originally known as Kcham, Terno was founded by Romani musician Edward Dębicki. It has performed in Poland and around Europe.

References

External links

Polish musical groups